The CB700SC Nighthawk 700S is a carburated, air-cooled, in-line four-cylinder motorcycle marketed by Honda solely in the United States for model years 1984–1986, with a standard or neutral, upright riding position, 6-speed transmission, hydraulic valve lifters, shaft drive, front bikini mini-fairing, gear indicator and 16" front wheel. At its introduction, the motorcycle carried a list price of $3,398.

Design and features
The four-cylinder engine featured double overhead cams, with hydraulic lifters which eliminated valve adjustments. The exhaust was a four-into-two finished in black chrome. The engine layout was the same as the 650 Nighthawk's, but of a different design sharing no parts. The bike also had shaft drive, electronic ignition, a digital gear indicator, an automatic cam chain adjuster, a spin-on automobile-style oil filter, and Honda’s second-generation TRAC (Torque Reactive Anti-dive Control) front end control system. Tire size on both front and rear wheels was 16 inches. Brakes were double disc in front, drum in rear.

The Japan-only shaft-drive variant was very close if not identical to the Canadian variant. The Japan variant was also made in a Police type configuration and sold to other Asian countries as such.

The Nighthawk 700S bodywork (1984–1985) was mostly black with either red or blue panels. In 1986, paint was navy blue with white decals and red pinstripes — or black with red decals and tri-color pinstripes. Valve cover and clutch covers were painted black as well as the wheels. The engine was black with polished edges on the cylinder head fins. Other components were also black including the lower fork legs, handlebars, and rear grab rails.

Tariff avoidance
The actual engine size of the CB700SC was 696cc, which by design was below the 700cc limit of a steep tariff imposed in 1983 by the United States International Trade Commission. In Europe and Canada, Honda marketed the CB750SC, a virtually identical bike with a slightly larger engine capacity.

The 700SC was similar to Honda's 650 Nighthawk, though the Nighthawk S featured a 700 cc engine, shaft drive and hydraulic lifters in a bike with a completely redesigned engine.

References

External links

 HondaNighthawks.net page on the CB700SC/CB750SC Nighthawk S

CB700SC
Motorcycles introduced in 1984
Standard motorcycles
Shaft drive motorcycles